This is a list of the 2007 NCAA Tournament winners:

Basketball
 2007 NCAA Men's Division I Basketball Tournament
 2007 NCAA Women's Division I Basketball Tournament
Ice hockey
 2007 NCAA Men's Division I Ice Hockey Tournament
Baseball
 2007 NCAA Division I baseball tournament
Softball
 2007 NCAA Division I softball tournament
Men's Lacrosse
 2007 NCAA Division I Men's Lacrosse Championship